Vincenzo Lombardo (21 January 1932, in Santo Stefano di Camastra – 2 December 2007, in Milan) was an Italian sprinter.

Biography
Vincenzo Lombardo won three medals at the International athletics competitions. He participated at two editions of the Summer Olympics (1952 and 1956), he has 14 caps in national team from 1955 to 1960.

After a successful career in athletics, he became a General of "Guardia de Finanza" and was active against criminals. He eventually went back to sports, starting as a sports manager and then rising up as a Chairman of FIDAL Regional Committee in Lombardi.

One of his two daughters, Patrizia and Rossana, was also in sports, representing Italy in 100m and 400m hurdles.

Olympic results

National titles
Vincenzo Lombardo has won 3 time the individual national championship.
 3 wins in the 400 metres (1952, 1954, 1955)

See also
 Italy national relay team

References

External links
 

1932 births
2007 deaths
Italian male sprinters
Athletes (track and field) at the 1952 Summer Olympics
Athletes (track and field) at the 1956 Summer Olympics
Olympic athletes of Italy
Athletics competitors of Fiamme Gialle
Sportspeople from the Province of Messina
Mediterranean Games silver medalists for Italy
Mediterranean Games bronze medalists for Italy
Athletes (track and field) at the 1955 Mediterranean Games
Mediterranean Games medalists in athletics
Italian Athletics Championships winners
20th-century Italian people
21st-century Italian people